The IMA Journal of Numerical Analysis is a quarterly peer-reviewed scientific journal published by Oxford University Press on behalf of the Institute of Mathematics and its Applications. It was established in 1981 and covers all aspects of numerical analysis, including theory, development or use of practical algorithms, and interactions between these aspects. The editors-in-chief are C.M. Elliott (University of Warwick), A. Iserles (University of Cambridge), and E. Süli (University of Oxford).

Abstracting and indexing
The journal is abstracted and indexed in:

According to the Journal Citation Reports, the journal has a 2019 impact factor of 2.275.

References

External links

Mathematics journals
Hybrid open access journals
Oxford University Press academic journals
Publications established in 1981
Quarterly journals